Cévennes National Park is a French national park located in Southern France, in the mountainous area of Cévennes.

Created in 1970, the park has its administrative seat in Florac at Florac Castle. It is located mainly in the departments of Lozère and Gard; it also covers some parts of Ardèche and Aveyron, therefore stretching across a record number of departments for a national park. The Aven Armand cave is located in the park. In 2011, the Park was made a part of The Causses and the Cévennes, Mediterranean agro-pastoral Cultural Landscape UNESCO World Heritage Site.

Geography 

The park includes several mountains and plateaus, including: Mont Lozère, Mont Aigoual, Causse Méjean, France. Mont Lozère is the highest peak in the area, reaching 1,699 metres.

History 
The Cévennes country is rich of history, with a strong cultural identity, being at the heart of Camisard revolt, which followed the revocation of the Edict of Nantes (the Edict of Fontainebleau), after which Protestants were actively prosecuted. Numerous testimonies of Camisard war in the Cévennes abund in towns and villages of the Cévennes National Park. A permanent exhibition devoted to the memory of Camisards has been elaborated at the old temple of Le Rouve (commune of Saint-André-de-Lancize).

Points of interest 
 Arboretum de Cazebonne
 Aven Armand

See also 
 List of national parks of France
 Travels with a Donkey in the Cévennes (1879) by Robert Louis Stevenson

External links 
 Official Site (English, French) https://web.archive.org/web/20040211160840/http://www.bsi.fr/pnc/ (in French)
 Regordane Info - The independent portal for The Regordane Way or St Gilles Trail. The Regordane Way crosses The Cévennes (in English and French)

References

National parks of France
Biosphere reserves of France
Geography of Ardèche
Geography of Aveyron
Geography of Gard
Geography of Lozère
Protected areas established in 1970
Tourist attractions in Occitania (administrative region)
Tourist attractions in Auvergne-Rhône-Alpes
Tourist attractions in Aveyron
Tourist attractions in Gard
Tourist attractions in Lozère
Tourist attractions in Ardèche